Charles Noel Crosby (September 29, 1876 – January 26, 1951) was a Democratic member of the U.S. House of Representatives from Pennsylvania and an American football coach in the early years of the sport.

Early life
Charles N. Crosby was born in a farming settlement named Cherry Valley, near Andover, Ohio.  He attended the New Lyme Institute and Allegheny College in Meadville, Pennsylvania.  He attended Western Reserve University in Cleveland, Ohio, where he was a member for the football team, graduating in 1897.  He moved to Linesville, Pennsylvania, in 1901, engaging in the manufacture of silos and in the lumber business.  He became engaged in agricultural pursuits in 1914.  He was a member of the Linesville and Meadville Boards of Education from 1920 to 1929, and served as president of the Meadville Chamber of Commerce from 1922 to 1924.

Political career
Crosby was elected as a Democrat to the Seventy-third, Seventy-fourth, and Seventy-fifth Congresses representing Pennsylvania's 29th congressional district.  He was an unsuccessful candidate for renomination in 1938.  He moved to Montgomery County, Maryland, in 1940 and operated a large dairy farm near Clarksburg, Maryland.

He was one of the 53 supporters in Congress along with Fiorello La Guardia in favor of a United States Constitutional amendment giving congressional power to overturn United States Supreme Court decisions.

Coaching career
While at Allegheny, Crosby was the head coach of the Allegheny Gators football team.  He held that position for the 1897 season and is the first coach on record for the program.  His coaching record at Allegheny was 0–4.

Death

He died in Frederick, Maryland, and was interred in Columbia Gardens Cemetery in Arlington, Virginia. He is interred at Columbia Gardens Cemetery in Arlington, Virginia.

References

External links

 

1876 births
1951 deaths
19th-century players of American football
Allegheny College alumni
Allegheny Gators football coaches
Case Western Spartans football players
Democratic Party members of the United States House of Representatives from Pennsylvania
People from Ashtabula County, Ohio
People from Linesville, Pennsylvania
Players of American football from Ohio
School board members in Pennsylvania